The Ring magazine was established in 1922 and gave an award for Progress of the Year from 1953 to 1988. It is given to a boxer who had made significant progress during the preceding year, or had otherwise made the most impressive jump from comparative obscurity to international prominence.

1953Nino Valdes
1954Pascual Perez
1955Chuck Spieser
1956Eddie Machen
1957Roy Harris (boxer)
1958Don Jordan
1959Charley Scott
1960Giulio Rinaldi
1961:
1962:
1963:
1964Vicente Saldivar
1965Alan Rudkin
1966Joe Frazier
1967Jimmy Ellis
1968Shozo Saijo
1969Mac Foster
1970George Foreman
1971Chris Finnegan
1972Bert Nabalatan
1973Santos Luis Rivera
1974Soo-Hwan Hong
1975Mike Colbert
1976Ruben Castillo
1977Eddie Gazo
1978Leon Spinks
1979Chan-Hee Park
1980
1981
1982
1983John Mugabi
1984Francisco Quiroz
1985Lonnie Smith
1986Samart Payakaroon
1987Kelvin Seabrooks
1988Michael Nunn

External links

Awards disestablished in 1989
Awards established in 1953
Boxing awards
Progress of the year
Ring